Mohamed Kheloufi (born 12 May 1959) is an Algerian footballer. He played in two matches for the Algeria national football team in 1982. He was also named in Algeria's squad for the 1982 African Cup of Nations tournament.

References

External links
 

1959 births
Living people
Algerian footballers
Algeria international footballers
1982 African Cup of Nations players
Place of birth missing (living people)
Association footballers not categorized by position
21st-century Algerian people